Corazzini is an Italian surname. Notable people with the surname include:

 Carl Corazzini (born 1979), American ice hockey player
 Sergio Corazzini (1886–1907), Italian poet

See also
Corazzo

Italian-language surnames